Melica fugax is a species of grass known by the common names little oniongrass and little melic. It is native to western North America where it usually grows in volcanic soils in forest and plateau habitat from British Columbia to the Sierra Nevada and North California Coast Ranges in California.

Melica fugax is a perennial bunchgrass growing up to 60 centimeters tall. The stems have clusters of onionlike corms at the bases similar to oniongrass (Melica bulbosa). The inflorescence is a narrow or spreading series of spikelets.

External links
Jepson Manual Treatment - Melica fugax
Grass Manual Treatment
Melica fugax - Photo gallery

fugax
Bunchgrasses of North America
Native grasses of California
Grasses of Canada
Grasses of the United States
Flora of British Columbia
Flora of the Cascade Range
Flora of the Klamath Mountains
Flora of the Sierra Nevada (United States)
Flora of the Northwestern United States
Natural history of the California Coast Ranges
Flora without expected TNC conservation status